Debra is a feminine given name.

Debra may refer to:

People
 Debra Adelaide (born 1958), Australian writer
 Debra Allbery (born 1957), American poet
 Debra R. Anderson (1949-2022), American politician
 Debra Austin (born 1955), American ballerina
 Debra Berger (born 1957), American actress, artist and designer
 Debra Bermingham, American artist
 Debra Bloomfield (born 1952), American photographer
 Debra Bowen (born 1955), American politician, Secretary of State of California from 2007 to 2015
 Debra Brown, serial killer
 Debra M. Brown (born 1963), American judge
 Debra Burlingame (born 1954), American lawyer and political activist
 Debra Byrd, American vocalist
 Debra Byrne (born 1957), Australian pop singer, actress and entertainer
 Debra Cafaro (born 1957) American business executive
 Debra Chasnoff (1957 – 2017), documentary filmmaker and activist
 Debra Christofferson, American actress of film and TV
 Debra Crew (born 1970), corporate chief executive
 Debra Daley, New Zealand author
 Debra Dickerson (born 1959), American author
 Debra Dobkin, American musician
 Debra Doyle (1952–2020), American author
 Debra Dunning (born 1966), American actress
 Debra Eisenstadt, American writer, director, producer and editor
 Debra Elmegreen (born 1952), American astronomer
 Debra Evenson (1942 - 2011), American lawyer
 Debra Feuer, American actress
 Debra Fischer, professor of astronomy
 Debra Jo Fondren (born 1955), American model and actress
 Debra Fox, American journalist
 Debra Fordham, American television executive
 Debra Gauthier, American police officer and author
 Debra Gillett, English actress
 Debra Gore (born 1967), British swimmer
 Debra Granik (born 1963), American independent film director
 Debra Green, British writer and speaker
 Debra Haffner (born 1954), ordained minister
 Debra Hamel (born 1964), American historian
 Debra Hand, American sculptor
 Debra Hayward, British film producer
 Debra Hill (1950 – 2005), American film producer and screenwriter
 Debra Hilstrom (born 1968), American politician
 Debra Holloway (1955 – 2011), U.S. Olympian in taekwondo
 Debra Humphris, English academic and nurse
 Debra Jensen (born 1958), American model
 Debra A. Kemp (1957 – 2015), American author
 Debra Killings (born 1966), American singer and bass guitarist
 Debra Kolodny, bisexual rights activist and congregational rabbi
 Debra Lafave (born 1980), offender
 Debra Lampshire, mental health educator
 Debra Lawrance (born 1957), Australian actress
 Debra Laws (born 1956), American singer and actress
 Debra Lee, several people
 Debra Lehrmann (born 1956), American judge
 Debra Maffett (born 1956), American beauty queen and television host
 Debra J. Mazzarelli (born 1955), New York politician
 Debra Marshall (born 1960), American former professional wrestling manager, actress and former WWF/E Diva
 Debra Mason (born 1968), British long-distance runner
 Debra Meiburg, Master of Wine
 Debra Messing (born 1968), American actress
 Debra McGee (born 1958), English television, radio and stage performer
 Debra McGrath (born 1954), Canadian actress and comedian
 Debra Milke (born 1964), American wrongfully convicted inmate
 Debra Monk (born 1949), American actress, singer, and writer
 Debra Moody (born 1956), American politician
 Debra Monroe, American writer
 Debra Mooney (born 1947), American actress
 Debra Mullins (born 1957), Australian judge
 Debra Nails (born 1950), American philosopher
 Debra Opri, American lawyer
 Debra Oswald (born 1959), Australian writer
 Debra Paget (born 1933), American actress
 Debra Pepler, Canadian psychologist
 Debra Peppers, American broadcaster
 Debra Phillips (born in 1958), Australian artist
 Debra Ponzek, American chef
 Debra L. Reed (born 1957), American businesswoman
 Debra Richtmeyer (born 1957), American classical saxophonist
 Debra Ringold (born 1954), American academic
 Debra R. Rolison, physical chemist at the Naval Research Laboratory
 Debra Rupp (born 1951), American film and television actress
 Debra Sandlund (born 1962), American television and film actress
 Debra Sapenter, American sprinter
 Debra Satz, American philosopher
 Debra Saunders (born 1954), American journalist
 Debra Saunders-White, American politician
 Debra Saylor (born 1962), American pianist, classical singer and voice instructor
 Debra Searle (born 1975), British adventurer, television presenter, author and motivational speaker
 Debra Searles. Australian theoretical chemist
 Debra Shipley (born 1957), politician in the United Kingdom
 Debra Silverstein, American politician
 Debra Solomon, filmmaker and animator
 Debra Sparrow, Musqueam weaver, artist and knowledge keeper
 Debra Stephenson (born 1972), British actress
 Debra Stock (born 1962), former English international cricketer
 Debra Teare (born 1955), American artist
 Debra Thomas (born 1967), American former figure skater and physician
 Debra Todd (born October 15, 1957), American judge
 Debra Waples (born 1953), American fencer
 Debra Webb, American writer
 Debra Weinstein, American poet
 Debra Winger (born 1955), American actress
 Debra Wilson (born 1962), American comedian and actress
 Debra Wong Yang, former United States Attorney for the Central District of California
 Debra Zane, American casting director

Fictional characters
 Debra Barone, from the American television comedy series Everybody Loves Raymond
 Debra Dean, on the British series EastEnders
 Debra Morgan, in the television show based on Jeff Lindsay's Dexter book series
 Debra Whitman, comic book character in Marvel Comics

See also
 Debrah
 Deborah (disambiguation)

Feminine given names